Cyrestis telamon  is a butterfly of the family Nymphalidae. It is found in Indonesia (Maluku Islands).

Subspecies
C. t. telamon Ambon, Serang
C. t. obianus Martin, 1903 Obi
C. t. obscuratus Martin, 1903 Bachan, Halmahera
C. t. obscurissimus Martin, 1903 Morotai

References

Cyrestinae
Butterflies described in 1758
Taxa named by Carl Linnaeus